Nielsen Glacier is a glacier, 4 nautical miles (7 km) long, discharging into the west side of Robertson Bay just west of Calf Point, northern Victoria Land. First charted by the British Antarctic Expedition, 1898–1900, under C.E. Borchgrevink, who named it for Professor Yngvar Nielsen of Christiania University, Norway.

Glaciers of Pennell Coast